The Xinhai Revolution Memorial Hall, fully named as Guangzhou Xinhai Revolution Memorial Hall, also known as Memorial Museum of 1911 Revolution, is a Guangzhou-based thematic memorial hall built to commemorate the Xinhai Revolution, with a total investment of RMB 319 million. The museum is located in Changzhou Island, Huangpu District, Guangzhou City.

History
Xinhai Revolution Memorial Hall was officially opened on October 8, 2011, with a main building area of 18,228 square meters.

References

Museums established in 2011
History museums
Museums in Guangzhou
Buildings and structures in Guangzhou